Nicholas Morys (fl. 1414), of Trumpington, Cambridgeshire, was an English politician.

Family
Morys married Margaret, and they had one son, the MP, John.

Career
He was a Member (MP) of the Parliament of England for Cambridgeshire in April 1414.

References

14th-century births
15th-century deaths
English MPs April 1414
People from Trumpington